Cooktownia robertsii, commonly known as the mystery orchid, is the only species of plant in the orchid genus Cooktownia and is endemic to far north Queensland. It is a rare ground orchid, named in honour of the first scientist to discover it, Lewis Roberts and has two ground-hugging leaves and up to nine small green flowers. It is an unusual species because of its highly modified column which lacks pollen and does not have a receptive stigma.

Description 
The flowers are apomictic, lack pollen and a receptive stigma, forming seeds without fertilisation. Flowering occurs between March and May.

Taxonomy and naming
Cooktownia robertsii was first formally described in 1997 by David Jones from a specimen collected in 1993. The generic name is derived from Cooktown, the nearest town to where this orchid is found. The specific epithet (robertsii) honours Lewis Roberts who discovered the orchid near his home in Shipton's Flat near Cooktown in the 1980s.

Distribution and habitat
The mystery orchid is only known from a small area south of Cooktown in tropical far north Queensland. Although it is highly localised, it can be locally common, is easily cultivated and reproduces freely.

References

External links 

 Nature's Powerhouse website contains a gallery of Lewis Roberts' botanical illustrations including Cooktownia robertsii
 The "Australian Orchid Name Index" and "Australian Orchidaceae - Current Genera and Species Checklist" may be downloaded here as pdf files
 Queensland Natural History Award to Lewis Roberts, 2016

Orchids of Queensland
Endemic orchids of Australia
Least concern flora of Australia
Monotypic Orchidoideae genera
Orchideae genera
Plants described in 1997